A list of films produced in the decade of the 1930s. There are only two movies were released in this decade. 

Rupkonwar Jyotiprasad Agarwala produced the first Assamese Film Joymati in 1935, under the banner of Chitralekha Movietone. The second picture Indramalati was filmed between 1937 and 1938 finally released in 1939.

A-Z film

References

External links
 
 

Assamese
1930s
Assamese